Petaloconchus intortus is an extinct species of sea snail, a marine gastropod mollusk in the family Vermetidae, the worm snails or worm shells.

Distribution
Fossils of this species were found in Southern France.

References

 Landau B.M., Ceulemans L. & Van Dingenen F. (2018). The upper Miocene gastropods of northwestern France, 2. Caenogastropoda. Cainozoic Research. 18(2): 177-368.

External links
 Lamarck, J.-B., 1818. Histoire naturelle des animaux sans vertèbres, présentant les caractères généraux et particuliers de ces animaux..., Tome 5 (1818): 1–612.
Encyclopedia of Life, Petaloconchus intortus http://eol.org/pages/4878345/names
Fossilworks, Petaloconchus intortus http://www.fossilworks.org/cgi-bin/bridge.pl?a=taxonInfo&taxon_no=114784

Vermetidae
Taxa named by Jean-Baptiste Lamarck
Gastropods described in 1818